Igan may refer to:
Arnold "Igan" Clavio (born 1965), Filipino journalist, newscaster, and television host
Igan, Malaysia, a village in the Malaysian state of Sarawak
Igan (federal constituency),  a federal constituency in Sarawak, Malaysia
Igan (state constituency), formerly represented in the Sarawak State Legislative Assembly (1969–91)
IgA nephropathy (IgAN), an autoimmune disease of the kidney
Igan, Nigeria, a village in the town of Ago Iwoye